Sandon County is one of the 141 Cadastral divisions of New South Wales. It is centred on Armidale, and also includes Uralla.

Sandon County was named in honour of Dudley Ryder, First Earl of Harrowby and Viscount Sandon (1762-1847).

Parishes within this county
A full list of parishes found within this county; their current LGA and mapping coordinates to the approximate centre of each location is as follows:

References

Counties of New South Wales